A double referendum was held in Georgia on 5 January 2008 alongside presidential elections. One question was a binding referendum on whether to bring forward the 2008 parliamentary elections from October to April/May. The second was a non-binding advisory referendum on joining NATO. Both proposals were approved with over 75% in favour. Parliamentary elections were subsequently held on 21 May.

Results

See also
Georgia–NATO relations

References

Legislative election date referendum
Georgia
Referendums in Georgia (country)
NATO membership referendums